The Sukma attack was an ambush carried out by the Communist Party of India (Maoist) against Indian paramilitary forces on 24 April 2017, during the Naxalite-Maoist insurgency. It was the largest ambush since a similar attack in 2010, in the neighbouring district of Dantewada.

The ambush took place between Burkapal and Chintagufa in Sukma district of Chhattisgarh, India. A group of 300 Maoists attacked a 99-member troop of the Central Reserve Police Force. Three Maoists and 25 police personnel were killed in the ensuing firefight.

See also
 April 2010 Maoist attack in Dantewada
 2013 Naxal attack in Darbha valley
 2021 Sukma-Bijapur attack

References

Conflicts in 2017
Communist Party of India (Maoist)
History of Chhattisgarh (1947–present)
Naxalite–Maoist insurgency
Sukma district
Terrorist incidents in India in 2017
April 2017 events in India
Mass murder in 2017